The 1954 season was FC Steaua București's 7th season since its founding in 1947.

Divizia A

League table

Results 

Source:

Cupa României

Results

See also

 1954 Cupa României
 1954 Divizia A

Notes and references

External links
 1954 FC Steaua București Divizia A matches

FC Steaua București seasons
1953–54 in Romanian football
1954–55 in Romanian football
Steaua, București
Steaua, București
Steaua
Steaua